Rio Mau is a Portuguese parish located in the municipality of Penafiel. The population in 2011 was 1,407, in an area of 6.13 km².

References

Freguesias of Penafiel